Colegio Franklin Delano Roosevelt is a K–12 school in Lima, Peru, founded by a group of American families in the mid-1940s, with the intent of providing an American Education.  While its first campus was in the San Isidro District, it eventually moved to the current location in Camacho, La Molina.  Its students, faculty, and staff are of various nationalities from all over the world.  There are approximately 1,300 students.

History
Colegio Franklin Delano Roosevelt is and was founded on the 3rd of December 1946 by American residents in Peru. It is a sectarian, non-profit, private day school supported by student tuition and fees.  The program is co-educational, non-residential and extends from early childhood (age 3) through twelfth grade.  The school is governed by a 12-member Board of Directors representing the Instituto Educacional Franklin Delano Roosevelt. The American School of Lima is accredited by the Southern Association of Colleges and Schools and the Peruvian Ministry of Education.

Enrollment
Total Pre-K – 12 enrollment is 1239 students, including United States citizens (24%), Peruvian citizens (54%), Korean citizens (5%), and nationals representing 42 other countries (17%).

School facilities
The Elementary, Middle and High School programs are housed in facilities distributed throughout the campus. The Dr. Anne S. Johnson Media Center, known within the school as the Media Center, was constructed in 1984 and has over 40,000 volumes of books as well as a wide range of audio-visual resources. The school has more than 500 computers installed in 3 labs, classrooms, and most offices. Two multipurpose gymnasiums also support the instructional and extracurricular athletic programs. In 2007, the school built an indoor swimming pool.

Academics
The educational program is that of a United States college preparatory school. Education is bilingual featuring obligatory courses in both English and Spanish.
The Pre-K through grade 5 elementary school is organized in heterogeneous classroom units. On September 8, 2010, the superintendent, Russ Jones, announced at the school's Superforum, that the grade 6 through grade 8 middle school would be eliminated in favor of a grade 6 through grade 12 upper school, beginning in August 2011.  The move was made to bring Colegio Roosevelt in line with other IBO world schools that offer the three International Baccalaureate programs on one campus. However, this was later revoked and there is an existing grade 6-8 middle school.

Emphasis in the High School (grades 9–12) is on preparation for entrance into colleges or universities in the US, Peru, or other countries. The curriculum is designed to meet both United States and Peruvian standards. All students follow the U.S. program of studies. Peruvian or international students who also wish to obtain a Peruvian certificate will take some additional courses in order to meet the Peruvian Ministry of Education's requirements.

Classes which vary in length meet for a minimum of 240 minutes per week the high school has a 7 period schedule with classes meeting 4 periods a week. Students may choose to obtain an International Baccalaureate Diploma, an Honors Diploma, a Peruvian Certificate, a United States diploma.  If they obtain the Peruvian, then they automatically obtain the US.  They can decide either to have the IB Diploma, or the Honors Diploma, which requires only 4 IB Courses, one at higher level, TOK, and the Service portion of CAS.

The School also offers a range of programs for students with special needs, including mild learning disabilities, remedial, and English-as-a-Second-Language. The American School of Lima is accredited by the Southern Association of Colleges and Schools and the Peruvian Ministry of Education.

Extracurricular activities
There are several student run clubs such as Community Service Club, Ecology Club, Korean International Club, Model United Nations Club, Speech and Debate Club, Wish Factory, Operation Smile, Girl Rising, Knowledge Bowl, Peruvian Social Studies Club, Roosevelt Theatre Association, Climbing Club, Web-On etc. There are also honor societies such as the National Honor Society, National Art Honor Society, Tri-M, TSA, Science National Honor Society, (Psi Alpha) Psychology National Honor Society, Varsity Club, and the National English Honor Society.

References

International schools in Lima
American international schools in Peru
Private schools in Peru
International Baccalaureate schools in Peru
Association of American Schools in South America